Slothrust (pronounced sloth-rust, IPA: ['slɔθ.rʌst])  is an American alternative rock band from Boston, Massachusetts, formed in 2010.

Background
Slothrust consists of Leah Wellbaum (vocals, guitar) and Will Gorin (drums). Wellbaum and Gorin first began collaborating as students at Sarah Lawrence College. After performing in various school groups, the two joined to create music with a "heavier" sound. 

The name Slothrust came together as a combination of Wellbaum's former project "Slothbox" and "rust" to signify time passing.

2012–2013: Feels Your Pain
The band released their debut album Feels Your Pain, featuring their lead single "7:30 AM". The track was later featured as the opening theme song for FX's television series You're the Worst.

In November, Slothrust collaborated with Wreckroom Records to record a cover of the Turtles' "Happy Together".

2014–2015: Of Course You Do
On February 18, 2014, Slothrust released their sophomore album Of Course You Do through Ba Da Bing.

2016–2017: Everyone Else
On July 7, 2016, it was announced that Slothrust were signing to Dangerbird Records.

The band premiered several tracks that lead to the release of their third full-length album, Everyone Else. The first single, "Horseshoe Crab", premiered via Noisey on August 10, 2016, was explained as "a dark narrative about love, loss, growing up, depression, and existential anxiety". Slothrust later shared "Like a Child Hiding Behind Your Tombstone", and "Horseshoe Crab".

Everyone Else debuted on October 28, 2016. The record was described as less angry and closely relating to dreams and the water, "Of Course You Do, as well as the one before that, Feels Your Pain, are a bit angrier. When you write songs earlier in your life—depending on where you’re at—the likelihood of them being angsty is higher," Wellbaum explained to Out Magazine, "This record I don’t think is angry in the same way. It asks more questions...[Everyone Else] has space for interpretation and for questions. And the new record deals very specifically with water and dreams in a way that the first two did not."

Kicking off the release of Everyone Else, the band announced a tour with rock band Highly Suspect in the fall of 2016. Additionally, the band celebrated the new album with a sold-out headline show at Brooklyn's Rough Trade music store/venue on November 1. The band performed Everyone Else in its entirety, in addition to various fan favorites such as "7:30 AM", "Crockpot" and "Homewreck Wifey".

The band spent the majority of 2017 touring, including US headline tours in March, July and August. The band also performed at Chicago's Lollapalooza. On August 3, 2017, it was announced that Slothrust would be touring the UK in the fall with the band Manchester Orchestra.

On August 8, 2017, Slothrust premiered a B-side track titled "Milking the Snake", via DIY.

2018–present: The Pact
After months of recording early in the year, The Pact was released on September 14, 2018. On release day, the band kicked off a two-month long tour to promote the album. Videos were released for the tracks '"Peach" and "Double Down". In February 2021 Big Mother Gig released "The Underdog", a song featuring vocals from Leah Wellbaum.

April 2021 the band announced their forthcoming fifth studio album, Parallel Timeline, which is set to be released by Dangerbird Records in September 2021. The songs "Cranium", "Strange Astrology", and "The Next Curse" have been released ahead of the album.

On August 7, 2021, two screen captures of a police report from the Columbus Division of Police were posted on image hosting site Imgur which detail a rape allegation against Kyle Bann. On August 13, the band announced that they were aware of "the current allegation against our previous bassist Kyle," and that he is no longer a part of Slothrust. On September 1, they announced that they would be touring with bassist Brooks Allison.

Band members
 Leah Wellbaum — lead vocals; guitar
 Will Gorin — drums
 Brooks Allison — bass (touring)

Discography

Studio albums

EPs

Singles

References

External links
 
 
 

Musical groups from Boston
Musical groups established in 2010
American musical trios
Rock music groups from Massachusetts
Alternative rock groups from Massachusetts
Grunge musical groups
Garage rock groups from Massachusetts
Dangerbird Records artists
2010 establishments in Massachusetts